Statistics of Latvian Higher League in the 1947 season.

Overview
It was contested by 7 teams, and Daugava Liepaja won the championship.

League standings

References
RSSSF

Latvian SSR Higher League
Football 
Latvia